Beach kabaddi at the 2008 Asian Beach Games was held from 19 October to 22 October 2008. Competitions were held at the Tanjung Benoa in Bali, Indonesia.

Medalists

Medal table

Results

Men

Preliminaries

Final

Women

Preliminaries

Final

References
 Official site

2008 Asian Beach Games events
2008
Asian